In mathematics, in the area of combinatorics and quantum calculus, the q-derivative, or Jackson derivative, is a q-analog of the ordinary derivative, introduced by Frank Hilton Jackson. It is the inverse of Jackson's q-integration. For other forms of q-derivative, see .

Definition
The q-derivative of a function f(x) is defined as

The q-derivative is also known as the Jackson derivative.

Formally, in terms of Lagrange's shift operator in logarithmic variables, it amounts to the operator

It is manifestly linear,

It has a product rule analogous to the ordinary derivative product rule, with two equivalent forms

Similarly, it satisfies a quotient rule,

There is also a rule similar to the chain rule for ordinary derivatives. Let . Then

The eigenfunction of the q-derivative is the q-exponential eq(x).

Relationship to ordinary derivatives
Q-differentiation resembles ordinary differentiation, with curious differences. For example, the q-derivative of the monomial is:

where  is the q-bracket of n. Note that  so the ordinary derivative is regained in this limit.

The n-th q-derivative of a function may be given as:

provided that the ordinary n-th derivative of f exists at x = 0.

A q-analog of the Taylor expansion of a function about zero follows:

Higher order q-derivatives
Th following representation for higher order -derivatives is known:

 is the -binomial coefficient.

Higher order -derivatives are used to -Taylor formula and the -Rodrigues' formula (the formula used to construct -orthogonal polynomials).

Generalizations

Post Quantum Calculus
Post quantum calculus is a generalization of the theory of quantum calculus, and it uses the following operator:

Hahn difference
Wolfgang Hahn introduced the following operator (Hahn difference):

When  this operator reduces to -derivative, and when  it reduces to forward difference. This is a successful tool for constructing families of orthogonal polynomials and investigating some approximation problems.

β-derivative
-derivative is an operator defined as follows:

When  then this operator is -derivative, and when  this operator is Hahn difference.

Applications 
The q-calculus has been used in machine learning for designing stochastic activation functions.

See also 
 Derivative (generalizations)
 Jackson integral
 Q-exponential
 Q-difference polynomials
 Quantum calculus
 Tsallis entropy

Citations

Bibliography

Differential calculus
Generalizations of the derivative
Linear operators in calculus
Q-analogs